Croly is a surname. Notable people with the surname include:

David Goodman Croly (1829–1889), American journalist
George Croly (1780–1860), Irish poet, writer, historian and theologian
Herbert Croly (1869–1930), American political writer and magazine founder
Jane Cunningham Croly (1829–1901), American writer